Club Deportivo Internacional de Intxaurrondo, or in short Inter, is a futsal club based in San Sebastián, city of the province of Guipuzcoa in the Autonomous Community of the Basque Country. The club was founded in 1990 and its home arena is the Polideportivo Mons with capacity of approx. 500 spectators.

Club history 

The club's first team has twice won the Liga Vasca, the highest futsal league in the Basque Country, in 2001–02 and 2010–11, and made it to the Tercera División de Futsal. Inter's greatest success came in 2016, when the first team earned promotion to the tier-three Segunda División B de Futsal for the first time. They finished second in the Tercera, one point behind champions Laskorain K.E., but the team from Tolosa, Spain decided to renounce promotion.

Honours 

Liga Vasca de Futsal:
Winners (2): 2002, 2011
Tercera División de Futsal:
Runners-up: 2016

Season to season

As of 9 September 2017

1 season in Segunda División B
10 seasons in Tercera División

References

External links
Intxa on Twitter
CD Internacional on YouTube
Intxa on Facebook

Futsal clubs in Spain
Futsal clubs established in 1990
1990 establishments in Spain
Sports teams in San Sebastián